Skalak may refer to:

Places
Skalak, Burgas Province, Bulgaria
Skalak, Kardzhali Province, Bulgaria

People with the surname
Jiří Skalák (born 1992), Czech football player
Richard Skalak (1923–1997), American biomedical engineer